Vikhroli is a railway station on the Central Line of the Mumbai Suburban Railway network.

History
In 1942,  The Godrej family brought plots in Vikhroli. Sir Phirojsha Godrej brought entire village in order to set up industrial township.

The station was built to serve the Godrej Industries Complex which houses several Godrej factories and IT companies like Accenture, Atos, Capgemini, WNS etc.

The old Godrej railway siding were crucial links that helped in setting up democracy in India by helping to conduct first general election.

References

Railway stations in India opened in 1947
Railway stations in Mumbai Suburban district
1947 establishments in India
Mumbai Suburban Railway stations
Mumbai CR railway division